Celestial (Versão Brasil) (English: Heavenly (Brazil Version) and also known as Celestial (Versão Português) (EN: Heavenly (Portuguese Version) in 2020 limited version) is the third and final studio album in Portuguese by Mexican pop group RBD, released on December 4, 2006 through the EMI label. The album is also the Portuguese version of Celestial, RBD's third Spanish studio album. The album contains 8 tracks in Portuguese, and 3 bonus tracks in Spanish. The album sold more than 600,000 copies throughout Brazil, Portugal and the United Kingdom.

Album information 
With the end of the telenovela Rebelde, from which RBD originated, the group's members could finally dedicate more time to music. Thus, as in the previous Brazilian editions of the group's studio albums, the songs that made up the original Spanish version of Celestial were translated and adapted by Cláudio Rabello, under the direction of Pedro Damián.

During the group's Tour Generación RBD (in Brazil called Tour Brasil 2006), the group was adapting to the tour repertoire in Portuguese. Soon after, the group announced that they would record a Brazilian Portuguese edition of the Celestial album. Despite the group's willingness to please their Brazilian fanbase, RBD band member Alfonso Herrera revealed that "singing in Portuguese 'hurt'" while training for the tour in the language.

As they had done the previous two years, the group re-recorded their latest studio album at the time in Portuguese, and released it on December 4, 2006. This time, however, different to the group's previous Portuguese albums, the recording and initial promotion for the album were done in Brazil. Also different from the group's previous Portuguese editions was that the Spanish songs included on the album were re-recorded too, and slightly rearranged. The album was recorded in studios in Manaus and São Paulo. The album was also released and marketed in the United Kingdom starting December 19, 2006.

Single 
"Ser Ou Parecer" was released as the album's only official single on September 20, 2006, and became RBD's final promotional single in Portuguese. The single was released only to radio to promote both versions of Celestial in Brazil. "Beija-me Sem Medo" was planned to be sent to Brazilian radio as well to serve as the album's second single, but the plan was eventually canceled.

Track listing

Translated songs
The tracks that were translated and recorded in Portuguese from their original Spanish language versions in the original album Celestial (2006) are:
"Ser Ou Parecer" ("Ser O Parecer")
"Celestial" ("Celestial")
"Talvez Depois" ("Tal Vez Después")
"Me Dar" ("Dame")
"Me Cansei" ("Me Cansé")
"Sua Doce Voz" ("Tu Dulce Voz")
"Beija-me Sem Medo" ("Bésame Sin Miedo")
"Quem Sabe" ("Quizá")

Charts

Release history

References 

RBD albums
2006 albums